Peronedys anguillaris, the eel blenny, is a species of clinid found in estuaries of southern Australia where it only inhabits beds of eelgrasses where the living grasses are bedded in decaying grasses.  It can reach a maximum length of  TL.

References

External links
 Photograph

Clinidae
Taxa named by Franz Steindachner
Fish described in 1883